Governor Milliken may refer to:

Carl Milliken (1877–1961), 1st Governor of Maine
William Milliken (1922–2019), 44th Governor of Michigan